Cola is a carbonated soft drink flavored with vanilla, cinnamon, citrus oils and other flavorings. Cola became popular worldwide after the American pharmacist John Stith Pemberton invented Coca-Cola, a trademarked brand, in 1886, which was imitated by other manufacturers. Most colas contain caffeine originally from the kola nut, leading to the drink's name, though other sources have since  been used. The Pemberton cola drink also contained a coca plant extract. His non-alcoholic recipe was inspired by the coca wine of pharmacist Angelo Mariani, created in 1863. 

Most modern colas have a dark  caramel color, and are sweetened with sugar and/or high-fructose corn syrup. They come in numerous different brands, with Coca-Cola and Pepsi being among the most popular. These two companies have been competing since the 1890s, a rivalry that has intensified since the 1980s.

Flavorings
The primary modern flavorings in a cola drink are citrus oils (from orange, lime, and lemon peels), cinnamon, vanilla, and an acidic flavorant. Manufacturers of cola drinks add trace flavorings to create distinctive tastes for each brand. Trace flavorings may include a wide variety of ingredients, such as spices like nutmeg or coriander. Acidity is often provided by phosphoric acid, sometimes accompanied by citric or other isolated acids. Coca-Cola's recipe is maintained as a corporate trade secret.

A variety of different sweeteners may be used in cola, often influenced by local agricultural policy. High-fructose corn syrup (HFCS) is predominantly used in the United States and Canada due to the lower cost of government-subsidized corn. In Europe, however, HFCS is subject to production quotas designed to encourage the production of sugar; sugar is thus preferentially used to sweeten sodas. In addition, stevia or an artificial sweetener may be used; "sugar-free" or "diet" colas typically contain artificial sweeteners only.

In Japan, there is a burgeoning craft cola industry, with small-scale local production methods and highly unique cola recipes using locally-sourced fruits, herbs and spices.

Clear cola
In the 1940s, Coca-Cola produced White Coke at the request of Marshal of the Soviet Union Georgy Zhukov.

Clear colas were again produced during the Clear Craze of the early 1990s. Brands included Crystal Pepsi, Tab Clear, and 7 Up Ice Cola.  Crystal Pepsi has been repeatedly reintroduced in the 2010s.

In Denmark, a popular clear cola was made by the Cooperative FDB in 1976. It was especially known for being the "Hippie Cola" because of the focus of the harmful effects the color additive could have on children and the boycott of multinational brands. It was inspired by a campaign on harmful additives in Denmark by the Environmental-Organisation NOAH, an independent Danish division of Friends of the Earth. This was followed up with a variety of sodas without artificial coloring. Today many organic colas are available in Denmark, but, for nostalgic reasons, clear cola has still maintained its popularity to a certain degree.

In June 2018, Coca-Cola introduced Coca-Cola Clear in Japan.

Health effects

A 2007 study found that consumption of colas, both those with natural sweetening and those with artificial sweetening, was associated with increased risk of chronic kidney disease. The phosphoric acid used in colas was thought to be a possible cause.

One 2005 study indicated soda and sweetened drinks are the main source of calories in the American diet and that of those who drink more sweetened drinks, obesity rates were higher. Most nutritionists advise that Coca-Cola and other soft drinks can be harmful if consumed excessively, particularly to young children whose soft drink consumption competes with, rather than complements, a balanced diet. Studies have shown that regular soft drink users have a lower intake of calcium, magnesium, vitamin C, riboflavin, and vitamin A.

The drink has also aroused criticism for its use of caffeine, which can cause physical dependence (caffeine dependence), and can reduce sleep quality. A link has been shown between long-term regular cola intake and osteoporosis in older women (but not men). This was thought to be due to the presence of phosphoric acid, and the risk for women was found to be greater for sugared and caffeinated colas than diet and decaffeinated variants, with a higher intake of cola correlating with lower bone density.

Many soft drinks in North America are sweetened mostly or entirely with high-fructose corn syrup, rather than sugar. Some nutritionists caution against consumption of corn syrup because it may aggravate obesity and type-2 diabetes more than cane sugar.

Regional brands

Asia
Air Koryo Cocoa Honeydew, a 'Coca Cola-style product' manufactured by the national airline in North Korea
Amrat Cola, popular in Pakistan
Big /Real/Royal Cola, popular in Indonesia, Thailand, Nigeria and throughout South America
Bovonto, popular in South India
Campa Cola, India's most popular brand prior to the reintroduction of Coca-Cola and Pepsi to the Indian market in 1991
Mojo by Akij Group, popular in Bangladesh
Est Cola, a local brand in Thailand
Future Cola, a local brand in China
KIK Cola, a local brand in Sri Lanka
Laoshan Cola, a local brand in China
Mecca-Cola, sold in the Middle East, North Africa, as well as parts of Europe
MyCola, a local brand in Sri Lanka
Pakola, popular in Pakistan
Cola Next, a local brand in Pakistan
Parsi Cola, popular in Iran
Red Bull Cola, popular in Thailand
Terelj Cola, sold in Mongolia.
Thums Up, popular in India
Topsia Cola, popular in Iran
Karwanchi Cola, popular in Iraq
Zamzam Cola, popular in Iran and parts of the Arab world
Zesto Cola, popular in the Philippines

Europe
Pop Cola, a Romanian brand with a retro Pop art design was launched in December 2019 and produced by Merlin's, a successful beverage Romanian company.

Pablo Cola, a Swedish brand with a Mexican style was relaunched in with the idea of making a cola selection that have a local touch of Sweden.
Afri-Cola, a German brand, was relaunched in April 2006 with the original formulation with the higher caffeine content.
Baikal, a cola-like drink popular in Russia
Barr Cola made by A.G. Barr (the makers of the popular Irn-Bru drink) in the United Kingdom
Breizh Cola is a local brand from Brittany (France).
Brisa Cola is a local brand from Madeira, Portugal and produced by Empresa de Cervejas da Madeira.
Cadet-Cola, an Irish brand
Cola Turka is a local brand in Turkey
Cockta is a local brand from former Yugoslavia, which does not contain any caffeine or phosphoric acid.
Corsica Cola is a regional cola distributed by the Corsican brewery Pietra.
Cuba Cola is a brand from Sweden.
Dobry Cola, a Russian brand which replaced Coca-Cola after the departure of global companies from Russia in 2022, produced in the same factories as the original products.
Evoca Cola is a cola made with mineral water made by Evoca Drinks.
Fentimans Curiosity Cola, is an upmarket botanically brewed cola produced by Fentimans, from the UK.
Freeway Cola, a cola  soft drink from Germany, produced as a private label for Lidl.
Fritz-Kola, a cola soft drink from Hamburg, Germany, uses the highest possible concentration of caffeine for beverages allowed by German law.
Golf Cola is a local cola brand from Serbia produced by Knjaz Miloš.
Grans Cola is a local brand from Sandefjord, Norway, by Grans Bryggeri. Sold exclusively at REMA 1000 in Norway.
Green Cola is a brand from Greece that is available also in Germany, Spain, Cyprus, the Baltic states, Romania, the Middle East, Slovenia etc.
Hay Cola is a local brand from Armenia, which began production in 1996.
Hofmuhl Cola is a local brand from Bavaria, made by a regional brewery.
Jolly Cola, which had a 40% share of the cola drink market in Denmark from the mid-1960s to the late 1980s.
Karma Cola, fair trade cola from the UK.
Kofola is the primary rival to Coca-Cola and Pepsi in the Czech Republic and Slovakia, and does not contain phosphoric acid.
LOCKWOODS Cola, a UK cola brand introduced in the 1960s produced by Lockwoods Foods Limited at their canning factory site in Long Sutton, England, the drink is not on the market anymore, it was sold nationally and also exported.
Maxi-Cola was sold by Mac's Brewery in England as a rival to Coke and Pepsi. Production ended in the early 90s.
Planet Cola, a brand sold at Auchan.
Polo-Cockta, a Polish brand.
Red Bull Simply Cola has been available throughout Europe since 2008.
Ritchie Cola, a Belgian brand first sold until the late 70s, relaunched in 2016
Sinalco cola is a German cola brand sold and produced in Europe
Siup! Cola, a Polish brand.
Sky Cola, a Bosnian brand since 2002 made by water-bottling company Sarajevski kiseljak
Sky Cola, a Croatian brand since 2002 made by water-bottling company Jamnica
Tøyen-Cola is a brand from Norway.
Ubuntu Cola is a fair trade cola from the United Kingdom available in parts of Western Europe.
Virgin Cola was popular in South Africa and Western Europe in the 1990s but has waned in availability.
Vita-Cola is a German cola brand with a distinct citrus flavor; nowadays it is mostly sold in eastern Germany.
XL Cola was a Swedish cola brand introduced in 1985, but the drink is not at the market anymore.
Mole Cola is an Italian cola sold in Italy it is also occasionally sold in France in stores called Noz only.

North America

Coca-Cola, often referred to simply as Coke, is produced and manufactured by The Coca-Cola Company. It is one of the most popular cola brands in North America and worldwide, as well as being the original cola.
Pepsi, produced and manufactured by PepsiCo, is also one of the most popular cola brands in North America and worldwide. Pepsi is the main competitor and rival of Coca-Cola.
RC Cola, short for Royal Crown Cola, is now produced by Keurig Dr Pepper
Cott produces many house brand beverages as well as its own line of products, most notably its Black Cherry and Bubba cola.
The Double Cola Company, Double Cola
Faygo Cola is distributed in the Eastern United States and can be found in some regions of Canada.
Fentimans Curiosity Cola, originating from the United Kingdom in 1905, now sold across Europe and North America
Jarritos Cola is a brand of cola from Mexico, native to Mexico and widely distributed to Latino residents of the United States.
Jolt Cola is sold by Wet Planet Beverages of Rochester, New York.
Jones Soda also makes a cola using cane sugar.
Nuka-Cola, produced by Jones in collaboration with Fallout series developer Bethesda Softworks and Target Stores from 2009-10, 2014-16 and 2020 to present.
Polar Beverages of Worcester, MA produces its own brand of cola under the Polar name.
Red Bull Simply Cola was available in the United States from 2008 to 2011.
Shasta Cola, produced by Shasta 
TuKola and Tropicola are brands from Cuba (also sold widely in Italy).
Zevia Cola is a zero-calorie soft drink sweetened with Stevia.
Bec Cola is produced in Montreal, Quebec, Canada, sold across Quebec and Ontario. It is sweetened with primarily maple syrup
Big 8 Cola is a brand of colas and other flavoured sodas that can be found in Atlantic Canada

South America
 Inca Kola, created by Lindley bottler to compete with Coca-Cola. It is still the best selling cola in Perú. 
 Big Cola, a cola produced by Peruvian company Ajegroup which operates in 14 countries in Latin America.
 Perú Cola, created by Peruvian bottler Embotelladora Don Jorge S.A.C. to compete with Coca-Cola and Kola Real.
 Kola Román, a cola that was invented in the city of Cartagena, Colombia in 1865 by Don Carlos Román.

Oceania
 LA Ice Cola is an Australian cola owned by Tru Blu Beverages, similar to Coca-Cola and Pepsi, its rivals.
 Billson's produces a Heritage Cola, inspired by recipes dating back to the Temperance movement in Australia.

Defunct brands 

 Hansen's Natural Soda, Original Cola, made with cane sugar

See also 

 Cola chicken
 Open-source cola – a soft drink whose recipe is publicly published
 List of brand name soft drinks products
 List of soft drink flavors
 List of soft drink producers
 List of soft drinks by country

References

External links 

Cola and Mentos mints trick
OpenCola recipe (originally published by Cory Doctorow)
Straight Dope article about caffeine levels on soft drinks

 
19th-century inventions
American inventions
Soft drinks
Historical polysubstance drinks